The Man, The Myth, The Legacy is the second album from rapper Lord Infamous, released on October 23, 2007. It was his first solo album in over a decade. Where Iz Da Love was widely thought to be a diss to Three 6 Mafia and more specifically DJ Paul but in an interview with memphisrap.com Lord said he was talking about himself. This has since been proven true as Lord did 8 tracks with DJ Paul on the album Scale-A-Ton.

Track listing
Intro 0:57
Where Iz Da Love 4:35
John 0:25
These Hoes (featuring La Chat) 3:12
You Don't Want None (featuring Enigma & D-Dirt) 4:18
Frosty (featuring II Tone & Mac Montese) 5:03
Money 0:34
Pussy Stank 6:07
Parking Lot 3:51
The Roll Song 5:07
Jump (featuring II Tone & Big Stang) 4:51
Pimpin' 0:30
BOC (featuring II Tone & T-Rock)4:55
Yeah I'm Wit It 4:36
Bank (featuring Santerria) 3:24
Ism (featuring Mac Montese) 4:48
Clubhouse Click (featuring II Tone, Mac Montese, Da Crime Click, Santerria & Big Stang) 3:44
Til Death 4:07

References
http://officialblackrainent.ning.com/profiles/blogs/the-man-the-myth-review-by

2007 albums
Lord Infamous albums